Bebearia dowsetti is a butterfly in the family Nymphalidae. It is found in Rwanda.

References

Butterflies described in 1990
dowsetti
Endemic fauna of Rwanda
Butterflies of Africa